The  is an electric multiple unit (EMU) train type operated in Japan by Kintetsu Railway since 1994.

Formations
The fleet of six 6-car sets are formed as follows, with four motored (M) intermediate cars and two trailer ends cars.

Cars 2 and 5 are each fitted with two scissors-type pantographs.

Interior
Cars 1 to 4 have regular 2+2 abreast unidirectional seating. Car 5 is designated a "Salon Car", and has fixed facing seating bays with tables arranged 2+1 abreast. Car 6 is designated a "Deluxe Car", and has 2+1 abreast unidirectional seating.

History

Refurbishment
The trainsets are scheduled to undergo refurbishment between summer 2012 and July 2013, with new interiors and external repainting in red or yellow liveries. The first refurbished set returned to service from 4 August 2012, with the last set completed by July 2013.

Further reading

References

External links

 Kintetsu Ise-Shima Liner 

Electric multiple units of Japan
23000 series
Train-related introductions in 1994
Kinki Sharyo multiple units
1500 V DC multiple units of Japan